The Battle of Sabana Larga was a major battle during the years after the Dominican War of Independence. It was fought on the 24 January 1856 in Sabana Larga, Dajabón. A force of 8,000 Dominican troops of the northern army, led by General Juan Luis Franco Bidó, defeated a numerically larger force of 22,000 troops of the Haitian army under Emperor Faustin I. Another part of the Haitian army was entrenched in Jácuba near Puerto Plata, but were defeated by Florentino and General Peter Lucas Peña.

References

Bibliography
 

Battles involving Haiti
Battles of the Dominican War of Independence
Conflicts in 1856
1856 in the Dominican Republic
1856 in Haiti
January 1856 events